Burial Ground (original title: Le Notti del terrore, also known as Nights of Terror, Zombi Horror, The Zombie Dead) is an Italian grindhouse zombie movie directed by Andrea Bianchi.  It is one of several films released under the alternative title of Zombie 3.

Plot
A scientist studying an ancient crypt near a grand mansion accidentally unleashes an evil curse. The curse reanimates the dead buried in the area, and the zombies devour the scientist. Three jet-set couples and the son of one of the women arrive at the mansion at the scientist's invitation. Rotting corpses quickly attack the guests as they begin rising from their graves. The group locks themselves in the mansion, and the zombies begin their siege past nightfall. The zombies then start to display unusually high levels of intelligence, using tools, axes to chop through doors, etc. One of the guests, George (Roberto Caporali), tries shooting at them but quickly runs out of bullets.

Zombies then break into the mansion and attack the guests in the library. One of the guests, the young Michael (Peter Bark), has become traumatized, and his mother, Evelyn (Mariangela Giordano), tries comforting him in another room. Michael, however, seems to be becoming sexually attracted to his mother and fondles her breasts while kissing her. Evelyn slaps him, and he runs off, screaming, "What's wrong?! I'm your son!" Michael then encounters the zombified Leslie, another guest, and stands still and stares at her while she shambles towards him, snarling and covered in blood. The group then decides to let the zombies inside the house, reasoning that they can distract them while they escape. Evelyn goes off to get Michael but finds Leslie has killed him, then has a nervous breakdown. The remaining survivors escape from the mansion and hide out until morning. They then find a monastery but discover that all the monks have become zombies. The zombie monks chase the rest of the survivors to a workshop in the middle of the forest, where they encounter the zombified Michael. Evelyn offers Michael to suckle at her breast, and he bites off her nipple. The last two survivors, Mark (Gianluigi Chirizzi) and Janet (Karin Well), are assaulted and killed by zombies in the workshop; as the scene fades, the zombies put their hands on Janet's head while she screams in terror. The misspelled "Profecy of the Black Spider" then appears on the screen ("The Earth shall tremble, graves shall open...they shall come among the living as messengers of death, and there shall be the nigths (sic) of terror") as the film ends.

Production
The film was shot in four weeks, at the Villa Parisi in Frascati, about 20 kilometres (12 mi) from Rome. Large portion of the film's budget was used on the special effects by Gino De Rossi and Rosario Prestopino.

The 25-year-old Peter Bark was cast as the young boy Michael to circumvent Italian laws restricting the use of children in film scenes featuring sexual and violent content.

Release
Burial Ground: Nights of Terror was given a belated limited release theatrically in the United States by the Film Concept Group in 1985. The film grossed $542,501. It was subsequently released on VHS by Vestron Video under the alternative title of Burial Ground. In the UK the film was released on VHS, on the Apex label, in 1986 as Nights of Terror with over 13 minutes of BBFC and distributor cuts, before being re-released in a more complete, but still censored, version in 2002 on DVD by Vipco, as The Zombie Dead. The first legitimate uncut release of the film in the UK did not arrive until 2016, when the BBFC waived all cuts for 88 Films blu-ray/DVD.

The film was released on DVD in the U.S in September 2006 by Shriek Show. It is available separately or in a triple feature package Zombie Pack, Vol. 2. The Zombie Pack, Vol. 2 includes Burial Ground: Nights of Terror, Flesheater, and Zombie Holocaust. In June 2011, Shriek Show released it on Blu-ray.

Reception
Peter Dendle called it "a high-impact, somber dirge that sustains tension mercilessly and wastes little time on plot and circumstance."  Dendle states that though it is often dismissed as a cheap clone of Zombi 2, Burial Ground improves on that film's strong points.  Marc Patterson of Brutal as Hell rated the film 2/5 stars and called it "uninteresting and dismissible."  Sara Castillo of Fearnet stated that the film is "notable for its near total lack of plot and bloody zombie breast-feeding scene".  Danny Shipka stated that the film was partially responsible for destroying the zombie film fad with its bad effects, acting, and writing.  Peter Normanton rated the film 5/5 stars and called the pace "breathtaking".  Normanton wrote that the film sacrifices plot for creative death scenes, but the low budget can cause the special effects to look "a tad farcical".  Glenn Kay wrote that "there isn't one iota of suspense or terror" and that the film is dull and pedestrian.

References

External links
 
 
 Burial Ground at Variety Distribution

1981 films
1981 horror films
1980s American films
1980s Italian films
1980s Italian-language films
Films directed by Andrea Bianchi
Films scored by Berto Pisano
Films set in country houses
Films shot in Italy
Incest in film
Italian exploitation films
Italian splatter films
Italian supernatural horror films
Italian zombie films
Living Dead films